Ignacio Raúl Capitani (born March 9, 1987 in Rosario, Argentina) is an Argentine footballer currently playing for San Luis de Quillota of the Primera División B in Chile.

Teams
  Rosario Central 2007–2009
  Castel di Sangro 2009–2010
  Toma Maglie 2010–2011
  El Tanque Sisley 2011–2012
  Sportivo Las Parejas 2012
  San Luis de Quillota 2013

External links
 
 Profile at Football Lineups
 

1987 births
Living people
Argentine footballers
Argentine expatriate footballers
Rosario Central footballers
El Tanque Sisley players
San Luis de Quillota footballers
Primera B de Chile players
Argentine Primera División players
Expatriate footballers in Chile
Expatriate footballers in Italy
Expatriate footballers in Uruguay
Association football midfielders
Footballers from Rosario, Santa Fe